The Classic Rock Roll of Honour was an annual awards program that ran from 2005 to 2016. The awards were founded by Classic Rock Magazine. Winners of the awards were chosen by the awards team and voted on by readers of the magazine. Winners are announced at an annual awards show and featured in the magazine.

Winners & recipients

2005
Held at the Cafe De Paris, London
Hosted by Andy Copping
Live acoustic performance by Motörhead
	 
 Best New Band: The Answer
 Comeback of the Year: Billy Idol
 The Showman: Arthur Brown
 Classic Songwriter: Ian Hunter
 The Metal Guru: Judas Priest
 Classic Album: In Rock by Deep Purple
 The Inspiration Award: Tommy Vance
 The V.I.P.: Neil Warnock
 The Living Legend: Lemmy Kilmister

2006
Held at The Langham Hotel, London
Hosted by Andy Copping

Best New Band: Roadstar
 Album of The Year: A Matter of Life and Death by Iron Maiden
 Band of the Year: Whitesnake
 Best Reissue: A Night at the Opera by Queen
 DVD of the Year: Live... In the Still of the Night by Whitesnake
 Event of the Year: Return of Monsters of Rock
 Classic Songwriter: Queen
 Comeback of the Year: New York Dolls
 VIP Award: Rod Smallwood
 Tommy Vance Inspiration: Phil Lynott
 Classic Album: Hysteria by Def Leppard
 Metal Guru: Ronnie James Dio
 Living Legend: Alice Cooper

2007
Held at The Landmark Hotel, London
Hosted by Nicky Horne

 Best New Band: Black Stone Cherry
 Best Reissue: Kiss Alive! 1975–2000 by Kiss
 DVD of The Year: Apostrophe (') / Over-Nite Sensation by Frank Zappa
 Album of the Year: Fear of a Blank Planet by Porcupine Tree
 Band of the Year: Rush
 Event of the Year: Aerosmith
 Classic Songwriters: Status Quo
 Metal Guru: Tony Iommi
 Showman Award: Jeff Wayne
 The Classic Rock / Childline Award: Ian & Jackie Paice 
 Tommy Vance Inspiration Award: Mick Ronson
 Outstanding Contribution: Storm Thorgerson
 Classic Album: Bat Out of Hell by Meat Loaf
 Comeback of the Year: Heaven & Hell
 Living Legend: Jimmy Page

2008
Held at the Sheraton Park Lane Ballroom, London
Hosted by Nicky Horne

 Best New Band: Airbourne
 Best Reissue: Reissues of Kill 'Em All, Ride the Lightning and Master of Puppets by Metallica
 DVD of The Year: Plug Me In by AC/DC
 Band of the Year: Foo Fighters
 Album of the Year: Good to Be Bad by Whitesnake
 The Songwriter: Peter Green
 Showman Award: Paul Stanley
 VIP Award: Harvey Goldsmith
 Event of the Year: Led Zeppelin at the O2 Arena
 Metal Guru: MC5
 Classic Album: Disraeli Gears by Cream
 Gibson presents the Tommy Vance Inspiration Award: Syd Barrett
 Marshall 11" Award: Slash
 The Classic Rock / Childline Award: Bryan Adams
 Outstanding Contribution: Jeff Beck
 Living Legend: Ozzy Osbourne

2009
Held at the Sheraton Park Lane Ballroom, London
Hosted by Danny Bowes

 Best New Band: Chickenfoot
 Album of the Year: Black Ice by AC/DC
 Band of the Year: Iron Maiden
 Best Reissue: Deluxe editions of Black Sabbath, Paranoid and Master of Reality by Black Sabbath
 DVD/Film of the Year: Anvil! The Story of Anvil by Anvil
 Event of the Year: Download Festival
 Outstanding Contribution: Ronnie Wood
 Tommy Vance Inspiration Award: John Bonham
 Innovator: Ginger Baker
 VIP Award: Doc McGhee
 Metal Guru: Biff Byford
 Spirit of Prog: Dream Theater
 Marshall 11" Award : Billy Gibbons
 Childline Rocks Award: Steve Harley
 Classic Songwriter: Paul Rodgers
 Classic Album: Rocks by Aerosmith
 Breakthrough: Joe Bonamassa
 Comeback of the Year: Mott the Hoople
 Living Legend: Iggy Pop

2010
Held at Camden Roundhouse, London
Hosted by Alice Cooper
Live performance by Cheap Trick and Alter Bridge ft. Slash

 Best New Band: The Union
 Album of the Year: Slash by Slash
 Band of the Year: AC/DC
 Event of the Year: "Don't Stop Believin'" by Journey hits No.6 on the UK Singles chart
 Reissue of the  Year: Exile on Main St by The Rolling Stones
 DVD/Film of the Year: Oil City Confidential by Julien Temple
 Breakthrough: Imelda May
 Spirit of Prog: Rick Wakeman
 Childline Rocks Award: Glenn Hughes
 Marshall 11" Award: Michael Schenker
 Innovator: Killing Joke
 Classic Songwriter: Roy Wood
 Outstanding Contribution: John Paul Jones
 Metal Guru: Geezer Butler
 Classic Album: Cheap Trick at Budokan by Cheap Trick
 VIP Award: John Jackson
 Tommy Vance Inspiration: Ronnie James Dio
 Living Legend: Rush

2011
Held at Camden Roundhouse, London
Hosted by Gene Simmons
Live performances by Jeff Beck with special guests, Chrissie Hynde and Joss Stone

 Best New Band: Vintage Trouble
 Album of the Year: Sensory Overdrive by Michael Monroe
 Band of the Year: Foo Fighters
 Event of the Year: The Wall Live by Roger Waters
 Reissue of the Year: Reissues package of 5 albums by Queen
 DVD/Film Award: Lemmy for Lemmy Kilmister
 Breakthrough: Black Country Communion
 Spirit of Prog: Jethro Tull
 Innovator: Deep Purple
 Classic Songwriter: Manic Street Preachers
 Outstanding Contribution: Bob Ezrin
 Metal Guru: Scorpions
 Classic Album: Quadrophenia by The Who
 VIP Award: Baron Wolman
 Tommy Vance Inspiration: Steve Marriott
 Musicians' Union Maestro Award: Steve Winwood
 Living Legend: Jeff Beck

2012
Held at Camden Roundhouse, London
Hosted by Duff McKagan
Live performances by Lynyrd Skynyrd, Saint Jude and Walking Papers

 Best New Band: Tracer
 Album of the Year: Clockwork Angels by Rush
 Band of the Year: Rush
 Event of the Year: Ginger Raises £ 250k
 Reissue of the Year: Immersion by Pink Floyd
 DVD/Film Award: The Story of Wish You Were Here by Pink Floyd
 Breakthrough: Rival Sons
 Spirit of Prog: Family
 Classic Songwriter: Russ Ballard
 Outstanding Contribution: The Damned
 Metal Guru: Anthrax
 Classic Album: Live! by Status Quo
 VIP Award: Tony Smith
 Tommy Vance Inspiration: Jon Lord
 Musicians' Union Maestro Award: Phil Manzanera
 Showman of The Year: Nikki Sixx
 Comeback Award: Lynyrd Skynyrd
 Living Legend: ZZ Top

2013
Held at Camden Roundhouse, London
Hosted by Fish
Live performances by The Darkness, Zakk Wylde and The Temperance Movement

 Best New Band: The Temperance Movement
 Album of the Year: 13 by Black Sabbath
 Band of the Year: The Rolling Stones
 Event of the Year: 13 by Black Sabbath hits No.1 on various charts
 Reissue of the Year: Rumours by Fleetwood Mac
 DVD/Film Award: Celebration Day by Led Zeppelin
 Breakthrough: The Virginmarys
 Spirit of Prog: Alex Lifeson
 Innovator: Wilko Johnson
 Classic Songwriter: Ray Davies
 Outstanding Contribution: Mott the Hoople
 Metal Guru: Zakk Wylde
 Classic Album: Blues Breakers with Eric Clapton by John Mayall
 VIP Award: Shep Gordon
 Tommy Vance Inspiration: Rory Gallagher
 Musicians' Union Maestro Award: James Dean Bradfield
 Showman of The Year: The Darkness
 Living Legend: Black Sabbath

2014
Held at Avalon Hollywood, Los Angeles
Hosted by Sammy Hagar
Live performances by Kings of Chaos, Scott Weiland & The Wildabouts, Rival Sons and California Breed

 Best New Band: The Cadillac Three
 Album of the Year: Going Back Home by Wilko Johnson and Roger Daltrey
 Band of the Year: Queen + Adam Lambert
 Reissue of the Year: Reissues of I, II & III by Led Zeppelin
 DVD/Film Award: Through the Never by Metallica
 Outstanding Contribution: Jeff Lynne
 Metal Guru: Dave Mustaine
 Classic Album: Blizzard of Ozz by Ozzy Osbourne
 VIP Award: Sharon Osbourne
 Tommy Vance Inspiration: The Doors
 Musicians' Union Maestro Award: Joe Perry
 The Bluesman: Eric Burdon
 Living Legend: Gregg Allman

2015
Held at Camden Roundhouse, London
Hosted by Chris Jericho
Live performances by Europe, Blackberry Smoke and Yoshiki

 Best New Band: We Are Harlot
 Album of the Year: Book of Souls by Iron Maiden
 Band of the Year: AC/DC
 Reissue of the Year: Led Zeppelin
 DVD/Film Award: Sonic Highways by Foo Fighters
 Comeback: Europe
 Showman of The Year: Noddy Holder
 Outstanding Contribution: Nils Lofgren
 Classic Album: Welcome to my Nightmare by Alice Cooper
 VIP Award: Rod McSween
 Tommy Vance Inspiration: Jimi Hendrix
 Living Legend: Queen

2016
Held at Ryōgoku Kokugikan, Tokyo
Hosted by Dave Mustaine
Live performances by Jeff Beck, Joe Perry, Rudolf Schenker, Johnny Depp, Phil Collen, Richie Sambora and Orianthi, Tesla, Cheap Trick.

 Best New Band: The Struts
 Album of the Year: Def Leppard by Def Leppard
 Band of the Year: Jeff Lynne's ELO
 Reissue of the Year: Queen: The Studio Collection by Queen
 Eastern Breakthrough Male Band: One Ok Rock
 Japan Next Generation prize: Band-Maid
 Asian Icon Award: Yoshiki
 Best Asian Performer: Sarah Geronimo
 Icon Award: Jeff Beck

References

British music awards
Awards established in 2005
Annual television shows
2005 establishments in the United Kingdom
Rock music awards